Sister chromatid cohesion protein DCC1 is a protein that in humans is encoded by the DSCC1 gene.

Model organisms 				

Model organisms have been used in the study of DSCC1 function. A conditional knockout mouse line, called Dscc1tm1a(KOMP)Wtsi was generated at the Wellcome Trust Sanger Institute as part of the International Knockout Mouse Consortium program — a high-throughput mutagenesis project to generate and distribute animal models of disease to interested scientists.

Male and female animals underwent a standardized phenotypic screen to determine the effects of deletion. Twenty four tests were carried out on mutant mice and four significant abnormalities were observed. Few homozygous mutant embryos were identified during gestation, and some displayed oedema, therefore less than expected survived until weaning. Those that did survive had increased chromosomal instability in a micronucleus test and numerous skeletal abnormalities by radiography.

Interactions 

DCC1 has been shown to interact with CHTF18.

References

Further reading 

 
 
 
 

Genes mutated in mice